Over 120 Hong Kong celebrities of Siyi ancestry  are enshrined in the Jiangmen Star Park.

 Kenny Bee (Xinhui)
 Anthony Chan (actor) （Xinhui）
 Connie Chan
 Kenneth Chan Kai-tai (Jiangmen)
 Peter Chan (businessman)
 Sita Chan（1987 in Hong Kong – 2013 Hong Kong, Xinhui)
 Cheung Po Tsai (1783, Xinhui –1822, Xinhui 
 Bondy Chiu
 Norman Chui
 Gillian Chung
 Ha Yu (actor)
 Kam Nai-wai
 Gigi Lai
 Lai Man-Wai
 Domingos Lam
 Andy Lau, actor (Xinhui)
 Hacken Lee
 Lee Hysan
 Jung Kong Lee
 Philip S. Lee
 Tina Leung
 Wu Tingfang
 Deep Ng
 Darryl O'Young
 Vivienne Poy
 William So
 Alan Tam
 Ti Lung
 Nancy Wu
 Michelle Yim
 Yip Hon
 Howard Young
 Joey Yung
 Lui Che-woo (Heshan)
 Lee Kum Sheung, founder of Lee Kum Kee
 Tony Leung Chiu-wai
 Donnie Yen
 Hu Die (Heshan)
 Li Shek-pang family

References

Lists of Hong Kong people
Siyi